Halobates micans is a species of water strider in the family Gerridae. It is one of five  Halobates species that live on the surface of the open ocean, only occurring near the coast when storms blow them ashore. Unlike the others that are restricted to the in the Indian and/or Pacific Oceans, H. micans is circumglobal, occurring offshore in warmer seas around the world. It is the only Halobates species found in the Atlantic Ocean (including the Caribbean) where it ranges from about 40° north to 40° south.

References

Halobatinae
Articles created by Qbugbot
Insects described in 1822